The 2008–09 HockeyAllsvenskan season was the fourth season of the HockeyAllsvenskan, the second level of ice hockey in Sweden. 16 teams participated in the league, and the top four qualified for the Kvalserien, with the opportunity to be promoted to the Elitserien.

Due to the league reducing the number of teams from 16 to 14 teams for the 2009–10 season, the worst team (Mariestad) was relegated to Division 1 while the other two worst teams, ranked 14–15 (Huddinge and Nybro) had to play in the relegation round for survival in HockeyAllsvenskan. In the relegation round, only the best team (Örebro) qualified for the following HockeyAllsvenskan season.

Participating teams

Regular season

Playoffs

First round
 Almtuna IS - Mora IK 2:1 (4:3 n.V., 0:1, 3:0)
 IF Troja-Ljungby - Växjö Lakers Hockey 0:2 (5:6 OT, 3:7)

Second round
 Almtuna IS - Växjö Lakers Hockey 1:2 (2:1, 2:4, 1:3)

Elitserien qualifiers

HockeyAllsvenskan qualifiers

External links

 Season on hockeyarchives.info

Swe
2008–09 in Swedish ice hockey leagues
HockeyAllsvenskan seasons